Destruction '07 was a professional wrestling pay-per-view (PPV) event promoted by New Japan Pro-Wrestling (NJPW). The event took place on November 11, 2007, in Tokyo, at Ryōgoku Kokugikan. The event featured nine matches, two of which were contested for championships. The event featured outside participants from American promotion Total Nonstop Action Wrestling (TNA). It was the first event under the Destruction name.

Production

Storylines
Destruction '07 featured nine professional wrestling matches that involved different wrestlers from pre-existing scripted feuds and storylines. Wrestlers portrayed villains, heroes, or less distinguishable characters in the scripted events that built tension and culminated in a wrestling match or series of matches.

Event
The event featured outside participants from American promotion Total Nonstop Action Wrestling (TNA), with whom NJPW had a working relationship at the time. In addition to Christopher Daniels, Rhino and Senshi, Ron Killings was also scheduled to wrestle at the event, but did not make the event. The event saw Shinsuke Nakamura make his return to the ring after a shoulder injury, which had sidelined him since the previous August. During the event, Dick Togo and Taka Michinoku successfully defended the IWGP Junior Heavyweight Tag Team Championship against former four-time champions, Gedo and Jado, and Hiroshi Tanahashi successfully defended the IWGP Heavyweight Championship against Hirooki Goto.

Results

References

External links
The official New Japan Pro-Wrestling website

2007
2007 in professional wrestling
Events in Tokyo
November 2007 events in Japan
Professional wrestling in Tokyo